The Amazigh Cultural Association in America (ACAA) is a non-profit organization established in New Jersey. This organization's goal is to  promote the Amazigh (Berber) languages and culture in the world, based on the fact that, due to the North African emigration, today there are people of Amazigh origin worldwide. However, the partnership focuses mainly on North Africa and the United States, where it is headquartered.

The partnership aims to strengthen and revive the Berber culture. The association works with other associations, universities and scholars, and promotes information about Berber culture and language in the world.

See also
 Berber Americans
 Maghreb Association of North America
 North Africa
 North Africans in the United States

References

External links 
 Amazigh Cultural Association in America - Amazigh Cultural  
 Camp 2011 Maghreb Association of North America
  Maghreb-American Health Foundation

Berber-American culture
Ethnic organizations based in the United States
North African American culture